Porvorim (pronounced Parvari  ), is the De facto legislative and executive capital of the state of Goa, India, as both the Goa Legislative Assembly and Secretariat are functioning from the same complex in the region of Alto Porvorim in porvorim.(Alto – Portuguese word meaning high or upper).
Soon it will also become the De facto judicial capital of Goa, when the High Court of Bombay at Goa (Bombay High Court – Panaji Bench) which is currently functioning from Lyceum complex in Panaji, is transferred to the new building complex which is being constructed in Alto – Betim Porvorim region of Porvorim. The construction of the new building is expected to be completed by December 2020.
Porvorim is situated on the right bank (north bank) of the Mandovi River, as de jure capital of Goa, Panaji is located on the opposite bank.
Porvorim is considered an upmarket residential hub as it lies on the Mumbai–Goa highway NH66. Goa's largest shopping centre – Mall De Goa – is situated here.

History
Historically, Porvorim was originally centered on the village market at the crossroad between the Panaji–Mapusa highway and the Socorro–Sangolda road. It used to be the por-vod or last vādo of the village of Socorro. Ecclesiastically speaking, the parish church was Nossa Senhora do Socorro, at Zosvaddo, Socorro; Porvorim was served by the Candelaria chapel near the market, and by the Holy Family chapel (now an independent church) higher up, in Alto Porvorim.

It was the ancestral home of eminent Goans such as Fr. Hubert Olympus Mascarenhas and Julio Ribeiro.

Development
Porvorim is now particularly a residential area with educational institutions around.

Many housing localities and complexes are also located in Porvorim, such as
Journalist Colony
Housing Board Colony
Pundalik Nagar
Kamat Nagar
SBI Varsha Colony
Defense Colony
Devashri Gardens
Devashri Greens
Nova Cidade
Sapana Gardens
Landscape City
Socorro Gardens
Post & BSNL Quarters

Porvorim is situated on the banks of the river Mandovi, with an excellent view of the state capital Panaji from the Mandovi bridge. Porvorim is home to several educational institutions, including the prominent Vidya Probhodhini Education Society, with pre-primary, primary, high school and senior secondary schooling sections.

Educational and Government Institutes
Porvorim is home to several educational and other governmental institutes.
 Directorate of Technical Education
 Goa Board of Secondary & Higher Secondary Education (GBSHSE)
 Vidya Prabodhini Parivar's L.D. Samant High School with Vidya Prabodhini Higher Secondary School
 ACDIL High School
 Holy Family High School
 Jnyan vikas
 Kids Kingdom International School
 Thomas Stefens Konkani Kendra
 Sanjay School for the disabled
 Spring Valley High School
 Teachers training college
 Institute of hotel management

Government and politics
Porvorim is part of Porvorim (Goa Assembly constituency) and North Goa (Lok Sabha constituency).

Landmarks 
Porvorim is home to many old as well as new beautiful landmarks. Porovorim houses the Goa's biggest mall situated on the national highway.

Hospitals, Health Centers and Pharmacies in Porvorim

Mandovi Clinic
Goa Scan Center
RG Urology and Laparoscopy Hospital
Manoshri Children's Hospital-Dr Kini's Clinic
Specs i Opticians
Chodankar Hospital
Jesus Mary Joseph Hospital
Dr. Sardesai X-ray and Ultrasound Clinic

References

External links

 Goa Govt website
 Goa tourism website

 
Cities and towns in North Goa district